Rex Sinclair Challies (15 September 1924 – 9 August 2003) was a New Zealand cricketer for Central Districts and Wellington between 1947 and 1956, in a total of 17 first class cricket matches. A legbreak spin-bowler, he took 45 wickets at 37.08, and contributed 98 runs in the lower order.

Challies was born in Nelson and died there, where he was "something of a character". Educated at Nelson College from 1934 to 1943, he represented Nelson in the Hawke Cup between 1945–46 and 1959–60.

Bowling his leg-breaks and googlies at just under medium pace, Challies played for Wellington in 1946-47 and 1947–48, then when the Central Districts side was formed he played for them from 1951–52 to 1953–54, before returning to Wellington in 1954-55 and 1955–56. For Central Districts he took 3 for 67 and 5 for 52 against Wellington in his only match of the 1952–53 season. His best figures of 6 for 112 came in his second-last match, against Auckland, in 1955–56.

References

External links
 
 Rex Challies at Cricket Archive

1924 births
2003 deaths
People educated at Nelson College
New Zealand cricketers
Central Districts cricketers
Wellington cricketers
North Island cricketers